Primauguet may refer to:

 Hervé de Portzmoguer, nicknamed "Primauguet", fifteenth century Breton captain 
 See French ship Primauguet for six ships of the French Navy named in his honour